The Sycamore Gap Tree or Robin Hood Tree is a sycamore tree standing next to Hadrian's Wall near Crag Lough in Northumberland, England.  It is located in a dramatic dip in the landscape and is a popular photographic subject, described as one of the most photographed trees in the country.  It derives its alternative name from featuring in a prominent scene in the 1991 film Robin Hood: Prince of Thieves.  The tree won the 2016 England Tree of the Year award.

Location 
This section of the wall follows the edge of a cliffan outcrop of the Whin Silland several sharp dips in it caused by melting glacial waters. The tree stands within one of these dips with the cliff and wall rising dramatically either side of it. The wall and adjacent land, including the site of the tree, are owned by the National Trust. A popular tourist attraction, the tree is described as one of the most photographed in the country and the location may be the most photographed point in all of Northumberland National Park. It is visible from the nearby B6318 Military Road. The name "Sycamore Gap" was coined by a National Trust employee when the Ordnance Survey were remapping the area and asked if the previously unnamed spot had a designation.

History 
The tree is a sycamore (Acer pseudoplatanus) and is a few hundred years old. It once stood alongside others but they have been removed over time for unknown reasons, possibly to improve sightlines or for gamekeeping purposes. The tree featured in a key scene of the 1991 Kevin Costner film Robin Hood: Prince of Thieves, and has subsequently become known as the "Robin Hood Tree". It appeared in the music video for Bryan Adams'  (Everything I Do) I Do It for You which featured on the film's soundtrack; the video was shown often on the British TV series Top of the Pops. It has also appeared in the TV crime drama Vera and in the documentary series More Tales from Northumberland with Robson Green. The four on board the aircraft were lightly injured.

In 2016, the tree was nominated for England's Tree of the Year competition.  It was selected from 200 competitors for the final shortlist of 10 and won the competition with 2,542 votes out of 11,913. The prize was a £1000 grant which was used to survey the health of the tree and to carry out work to protect its roots, which were becoming exposed due to the high volume of foot traffic passing over them.  The Sycamore Gap Tree was entered in the 2017 European Tree of the Year awards in which it came 5th out of 16, polling 7,123 votes.

Gallery

References 

Maple
Individual trees in England
Hadrian's Wall
Tourist attractions in Northumberland